Stal Stalowa Wola is a Polish basketball team competing in the third basketball league, based in Stalowa Wola. The team have played in the Polish Basketball League.

History 
Stal Stalowa Wola played in the Polish Basketball League in the 1987/1988 season, from the 1989/1990 season to the 1997/1998 season, and in the 2009/2010 season. The greatest successes of basketball players are twice the fifth place in the 1990/1991 and 1994/1995 seasons. In 2010, the club withdrew from the Polish Basketball League due to the lack of funds (in order to start in PBL, the club had to have a budget of PLN 2 million, which was lacking in Stal).

Season by season

Notable players

References 

Stal Stalowa Wola
Basketball teams in Poland
Sport in Podkarpackie Voivodeship